Sir Henry Hobart, 1st Baronet  (1 January 1560 – 29 December 1625), of Blickling Hall, was an English politician who succeeded Sir Edward Coke to become Chief Justice of the Court of Common Pleas.

Background and education
The son of Thomas Hobart and Audrey Hare, and great-grandson of Sir James Hobart of Monks Eleigh, Suffolk, who served as Attorney General during the reign of King Henry VII. He would further this lineal occupation and was admitted to Lincoln's Inn on 10 August 1575, and was later called to the Bar in 1584, and subsequently became governor of Lincoln's Inn in 1591.

He was the stepson of Sir Edward Warner (1511–1565), Lieutenant of the Tower of London, and William Blennerhassett. His mother Audrey (d. 16 July 1581), daughter and heiress of William Hare of Beeston, Norfolk, was married three times. Her first husband was Thomas Hobart of Plumstead (d. 26 March 1560), her second Sir Edward Warner, who been knighted on 18 May 1544, and her third William Blennerhassett. Her epitaph describes all three of them as cousins-german of each other. Audrey's mother was Alice Wayte (1494 – 11 July 1566), the daughter of William Wayte of Tittleshall. As the widow of William Hare of Beeston, Alice married secondly, as his second wife, Robert Rugge, Mayor of Norwich (d. 18 February 1558/9).

His grandmother Alice, who lived until he was six years old, lies buried in the church in Little Plumstead, Norfolk. The daughter Etheldred mentioned in her epitaph is her daughter Audrey. Audrey was a common nickname for Etheldred. There is a tablet in the same church to Audrey, in which she is remembered lovingly by her two sons, Henry and his elder brother Miles.

His father Thomas, who lived until he was not two months old, rests in the same church, his gravestone is in the north chapel, next to Miles Hobart, Esq. and Hellen his wife, daughter and coheir of John Blennerhassett of Frense, Esq., his parents and Sir Henry's grandparents.

Miles Hobart (d. 1557), Esq., Sir Henry's grandfather, was the second son of Sir James Hobart.  By his will, dated 6 August 1557, he appoints to be buried in the chapel on the north side of the church. His will was proven on 22 February 1557. He married Hellen, daughter and coheir of John Blennerhasset of Frense, in Norfolk, Esq. Anne, sister and coheir with Hellen, married Sir Henry Grey, knight, of Bedfordshire.

Miles Hobart, Esq., Sir Henry's brother, was the eldest son and heir of their father Thomas Hobart. He was also a minor at the death of their father. He was living and lord in 1576 and 1595. Margaret, his wife, was a daughter of Sir Thomas Woodhouse, knight, of Waxham, in Norfolk, and the niece of Sir William Woodhouse. His son, Sir Thomas Hobart, married Willoughby Hopton, daughter of Sir Arthur Hopton of Westwood, and Blyburgh in Suffolk. Sir Thomas's son, Miles, succeeded his father. He was knighted at the coronation of King Charles I, and, as Sir Miles Hobart, married Margaret, daughter of Edward Sutton, 5th Dudley. She is buried in the church of St Margaret's, Westminster.

Legal and political career

Between 1588 and 1589, Hobart was Member of Parliament (MP) for St Ives, for Great Yarmouth in 1597 and 1601, and for Norwich from 1604 to 1611. He was Steward of Norwich in 1595, made Serjeant from 1603 to 1606, and later served as Attorney for the Court of Wards in 1605 and Attorney General for England and Wales between 1606 and 1613 while Bacon was Solicitor-General.  While in that post, they argued Calvin's Case, by which the Rights of Englishmen were bestowed on the postnati Scots. 

From 1613 to 1625, his abilities were further recognized and he was elevated to Chief Justice of the Court of Common Pleas. Hobart was knighted in 1603 and made Baronet, of Intwood in the County of Norfolk on 11 May 1611. 

He successfully acquired a fair amount of Norfolk property, including the estates of Intwood in 1596 and Blickling in 1616, where he was buried on 4 January 1626 (new calendar).

Family
On 21 April 1590, he married Dorothy Bell, the daughter of Sir Robert Bell, in Blickling, Norfolk. A letter sent to Dorothy Hobart in 1626 was discovered at Lauderdale House in 1800.

They had twelve sons including John Hobart and four daughters. The following analysis should be regarded as a work in progress as of August 2020:

All four daughters are believed to be identified:
 Dorothea or Dorothy  1592–1624 but Lothian Blickling Collection suggests alive in 1635. Investigation ongoing
 Philippa  Cited as a daughter dates not known but Lothian Blickling Collection suggests alive in 1635
 Mary Elizabeth 1608–1633
 Frances 1612–1632

11 of the 12 sons are believed to be identified:
 Henry (I) 1591–1609
 Sir John Hobart, 2nd Baronet (1593–1647), second but eldest surviving son
 Edmund 1594–1607
 Miles Hobart (1595–1639) of Intwood who married Frances, daughter of Sir John Peyton, 1st Baronet of Isleham, Cambridgeshire, widow of Sir Philip Bedingfield of Ditchingham, Norfolk, and had Sir John Hobart, 3rd Baronet (1628–1683)
 Thomas (I) 1597–1600
 Nathaniel 1600–1674
 Edward 1601- ? Possibly the Edward who died "beyond the seas" 1627-8 
 James 1603–1643
 Thomas (II) 1605–1633
 Robert 1606-?
 Henry (II) 1619–1638, known to be the youngest son
(One presently unknown; possibly an unnamed infant)

See also
Earl of Buckinghamshire

References

External links

Blickling Hall, Blicklng, Norfolk, The National Trust, nationaltrust.org.uk

1560 births
1625 deaths
Baronets in the Baronetage of England
Chief Justices of the Common Pleas
Members of Lincoln's Inn
Knights Bachelor
17th-century English judges
Attorneys General for England and Wales
Henry
English MPs 1589
English MPs 1597–1598
English MPs 1601
English MPs 1604–1611
People from Blickling